Niyamaddin Pashayev (born May 1, 1980 in Qubadlı, Azerbaijani SSR) is an Azerbaijani taekwondo athlete. He has won gold medals in both the European and World Taekwondo Championships.

References

1980 births
Living people
Azerbaijani male taekwondo practitioners
Olympic taekwondo practitioners of Azerbaijan
Taekwondo practitioners at the 2004 Summer Olympics
European Taekwondo Championships medalists
World Taekwondo Championships medalists
20th-century Azerbaijani people
21st-century Azerbaijani people